National Campaign for People's Right to Information (NCPRI) was established in 1996 to advocate for a legal backing to citizens right to information. This resulted in the historic and pro-people law - the Right to Information Act, 2005. More recently, this movement has also campaigned for Grievance redressal bill and Whistleblowers protection bill. It is a network of organisations and individuals who use the Right to Information law to demand transparency and accountability of government, but also support the use of the RTI in various other sectors to demand accountability.

History
The campaign has its roots in the work and experiences of the Mazdoor Kisan Shakti Sangathan. It was established in 1996 at a gathering of more than a hundred activist organisations. Later that year, it drafted the first version of a Right to Information Law in India, along with the Press Council of India. The city of Beawar now has an official plaque that pays tribute to the Chang Gate protest which has a pivotal moment in the fight for the RTI. This history has been documented in the book, among others, RTI Story by Aruna Roy and MKSS Collective (Roli Books, 2018).

Anti-Corruption Bills 
The National Campaign for People's Right to Information demanded the Whistleblowers Protection Bill, 2011, be amended, including by a clearer definition of victimization, protection for persons other than the whistleblowers who provide relevant information, penalty for mala fide revelation of the identity of whistleblowers, a time limit for complaints and provision for filing anonymous complaints.

The campaign has steadily fought for the passage of the Whistleblower Protection bill since September 2010. As a part of public action for the passage of the bill, families of whistleblowers gathered in Delhi to demand the immediate passage of the bill. The Whistleblower Protection bill was passed on 21 February 2014.

The other Bill that the NCPRI advocated for was a Grievance Redressal Bill.

Affiliate Organisations & Resources 
There are several organizations and individuals that are part of the NCPRI. Some of them are as follows:

 Mazdoor Kisan Shakti Sangathan (MKSS)
 Commonwealth Human Rights Initiative (CHRI)
 Mahiti Adhikar Manch
 Mahiti Adhikar Gujarat Pahel (MAGP) 
 Satark Nagrik Sangathan 
 Kerala Chapter, NCRPI
 Jan Jagran Shakti Sangathan

Opposition to RTI Amendments 2019 
The NCPRI opposed the RTI Amendment Bill 2019, and more details on the campaign position can be found on their official website here. In response to the amended law, the 'Use RTI, Demand Accountability' campaign has been launched.

Important RTI's 

 On Electoral Bonds:   - SBI received Rs. 3.47 crore as commission, Dec 2020  - Rs. 1000 Electoral Bond unclaimed  - Quantity of Bonds sold since 2018  - 2/3 donations to parties via bonds  - More Party Funding, Ever More Opaque
 COVID & Lockdown:   - RTI reveals CPIO of Chief Labour Commissioner's Office has no Data about Stranded Migrant Workers despite April 2020 Enumeration Circular  - CIC issues advisory to the Chief Labour Commissioner to publish stranded migrant workers' data within a week- RTI Impact  - Union Health Ministry appoints Nodal Officer to collect and publish country-wide COVID Hospitals List in compliance with CIC's recent Advisory  - Under India's RTI Act- Union Health Ministry and ICMR plead ignorance about National COVID Vaccine Expert Group's records
 Misc  - 12 Top Nationalised Banks Wrote Off Rs6.32 Lakh Crore in 8 Years; Recovered Just 7% of Write Off Debt from Big Defaulters, Nov 2020  - SC Rejects RTI Exonerating Justice Gogoi  - After demonetisation decision making RTIs RBI pro-actively disclosed minutes of meetings  - OBC Farmers constitute 41.5% of PM-Kisan beneficiaries, Nov 2020
Pathalgadi, Jharkhand: Even though the govt announced a year ago withdrawal of all the Pathalgadi cases, RTI replies show that the administration has recommended withdrawal of only 60% cases and no case has been withdrawn yet.See Details of RTI

Important Publications 

 Report Card of Information Commissions, 2019-20
 9 out of 29 (31%) Information Commissions were found to be headless i.e. functioning without a Chief.
 Nearly 60% of commissioners have been retired government officials. In terms of gender diversity, only 10% of all information commissioners across the country have been women. Currently, no commission is headed by a woman.
 Several commissions had a tardy rate of disposal of cases. For instance, the Odisha SIC had a concerningly low annual average disposal rate of 1,101 cases per commissioner (about 4 cases a day), even though nearly 16,000 cases were pending in the SIC. The disposal rate of the CIC also fell short of the norm set by it.
 Information commissions did not impose penalties in more than 96% of the cases where they were imposable sending out a signal to public authorities that violations of people's RTI will not result in any consequences.
 Is transparency a burden on public authorities: Findings from a study of Central Government data as RTI completes 15 years by CHRI
 The total number of RTIs  reported by public authorities under the Central Government has risen by more than 83% (83.83%) from 8.86 lakhs (886,681) in 2012-13 to 16.30 lakhs (1,630,048) in 2018-19 (this includes backlog from the previous year and fresh receipts during the reporting year)  However, the number of CPIOs designated to handle these RTIs has gone up by a little more than 13% (13.41%) from 21,204 in 2012-13 to 24,048 in 2018-19;
 On an average, a CPIO handled less than 42 RTIs (41.82) in 2012-13. In 2018-19, this increased to almost 68 RTIs in a year (67.78). The monthly average no. of RTIs per CPIO rose from less than 4 to less than 6 RTIs between 2012-13 and 2018-19.  Does handling between 4-6 RTI applications per month amount to spending 75% of a CPIO's time? That question can be answered only by examining the content of the RTI application which will reveal the volume of the period for which information is requested. 
 Rapid Study on Functioning of Information Commissions During COVID Lockdown, April 2020
 The CIC started working in right earnest during the first phase of the lockdown to resume case hearings 20 April 2020 onwards. Apart from internal consultations, it also held two rounds of external consultations with civil society advocates and former Chief Information Commissioners about its plans for resuming work. The Cause List displayed for the week beginning 20 April shows that the CIC scheduled hearings through audio conferencing in at least 337 cases. At close of business on 25 April (Friday), decisions in 279 cases had been uploaded on its website. We are only placing their statistical data in the public domain without making any comment about the contents of the decisions. We did not have to call up the CIC because information about its working is already available in the public domain.
 During the second phase of the lockdown (which is in force at the time of writing this report) nobody picked up the phone at the Uttarakhand SIC. An individual present at the office of the Haryana SIC, who did not identify himself. stated that hearings might be resumed after the lockdown ends. 
During the second phase of the lockdown my colleague was able to get through to the SICs in Andhra Pradesh  Goa, Telangana and Tamil Nadu as well. The Goa SIC had started working with a couple of junior level staffers who were unsure when hearings would resume. They said, none of the ICs nor the senior staff were attending office. Only one staffer was attending office in each of the SICs of Andhra Pradesh, Telangana and Tamil Nadu. All of them said they were unsure of the exact date on which the hearings would resume in their respective SICs.  Goa and Telangana SICs were being manned by a lady staffer each.

Important Television Debates, Articles, Interviews, Books & Lectures 

15 Years of RTI, Nikhil Dey in Frontline Magazine, December 2020
Pustak Lokarpan Lecture by Aruna Roy, November 2020
 Bhaskar Prabhu on Brihanmumbai Municipal Corporation
 Six Years On, Lokpal is a Non-Starter, The Hindu
 Moneylife Foundation Annual RTI Lectures: "Is Good Governance the Right of a Citizen in Democracy?", Sept 2019
 5 November 2001, Noam Chomsky on 'Militarism, Democracy and People's Right to Information' at the Delhi School of Economics
Capturing Institutional Change: The Case of the Right to Information Act in India, 2021, by Himanshu Jha

Article 370 & Weakening J&K RTI 

 How Abrogation Of Special Status Has Weakened The RTI Regime Of J&K? Dr Raja Muzaffar Bhat 
 RTI records reveal J&K's General Admin Dept. works at cross purposes with DoPT delaying application of Central RTI Act in J&K

NCPRI Conventions, Public Meetings, Activities & Hearings 

 Public Meeting of RTI activists and users to mark 15 years of RTI in India, 12 October 2020
 Participation in Jan Sarokar, People's Agenda, August 2020
 Use RTI to Save RTI
 Jan Manch on Electoral Bonds, RTI Amendments & Whistleblower Protection Bill, December 2019

Recent activities
The National Campaign for People's Right to Information met the Prime Minister on 19 August 2013 to submit a petition seeking deferring amendments related to the exclusion of the political parties from the ambit of the Right to Information Act.

Dhananjay Dubey, brother of murdered whistleblower Satyendra Dubey, and the National Campaign for People's Right to Information started a petition signed by over 10,000 people demanding the immediate passage of the Whistleblower Protection and Grievance Redress bills.

The NCPRI supports and endorses efforts towards accountability and transparency in various domains.

References

Political advocacy groups in India